Margaret "Meg" Sutherland McCall was a Canadian politician, who represented the electoral district of Klondike in the Yukon Legislative Assembly from 1978 to 1982. She was a member of the Yukon Progressive Conservative Party.

She defeated Yukon New Democratic Party leader Fred Berger and independent candidate Eleanor Millard in the 1978 territorial election. She died of cancer in 1997.

References

Women MLAs in Yukon
Yukon Party MLAs
1931 births
1997 deaths
Deaths from cancer in British Columbia
20th-century Canadian women politicians